Adolf H. A. Weidig (b. 28 November 1867 Hamburg, Germany; d. 23 September 1931) was an American composer who was born and raised in Hamburg. After extensive musical studies in Europe, including at the Academy of Music, Munich, he immigrated to the United States in 1892 as a young man.

He wrote numerous pieces for orchestra, including a symphony and the tone poem Semiramis; among his chamber works are three string quartets and a string quintet.  He also wrote songs. He died in Hinsdale, Illinois.

For years Weidig served as Associate Director of the American Conservatory of Music in Chicago and was Dean of the Department of Theory in the same. His composition students included harpist Helena Stone Torgerson, pianist Theodora Troendle, organist Helen Searles Westbrook, and, most notably, composer Ruth Crawford Seeger.

References

Further reading
 Baker's Biographical Dictionary of Musicians, Sixth edition, revised by Nicolas Slonimsky (1894–1995), London: Collier Macmillan Publishers
 Baker's Biographical Dictionary of Musicians, Seventh edition, revised by Nicolas Slonimsky(1894–1995), New York: Macmillan Publishing Co./Schirmer Books, 1984
 Baker's Biographical Dictionary of Musicians, Eighth edition, revised by Nicolas Slonimsky, |New York: Macmillan Publishing, 1992
 Biographical Dictionary of American Music, by Charles Eugene Claghorn (1911–2005), West Nyack, New York: Parker Publishing Co., 1973
 Dictionary of American Biography. Volumes 1-20, New York: Charles Scribner's Sons, 1928-1936
 The Oxford Companion to Music. 1974 edition, by Percy Alfred Scholes (1877–1958), edited by John Owen Ward, London: Oxford University Press, 1974
 Who Was Who in America, a component volume of Who's Who in American History, Volume 1, 1897-1942, Chicago: A.N. Marquis Co., 1943

External links

Adolf Weidig Music Manuscripts at the Newberry

1867 births
1931 deaths
American male composers
American composers
German emigrants to the United States
Pupils of Josef Rheinberger
Pupils of Hugo Riemann
University of Music and Performing Arts Munich alumni
American Conservatory of Music faculty